Elmer Harris may refer to:

 Elmer Beseler Harris (1939–2019), American businessman and politician
 Elmer Frank Harris (born 1939), Newfoundland broadcasting personality and philanthropist
 Elmer Blaney Harris (1878–1966), American playwright and author
 Elmer W. Harris (1925–1956), U.S. Air Force fighter pilot during the Korean War